Andriëtte Norman, who often performs as Andriëtte, is an Afrikaner singer from the Cape Town suburb Brackenfell.

In 2007 Andriëtte was a runner-up in the fourth season of Idols South Africa, and released a single from the show ("Love Is All Around"). She released her debut album, Diamant, in 2008, followed by Dink Aan My (2009), Vat My Hoër (2011), Wat Rym Met Liefde (2013), and Pêrel vir 'n Kroon (2015).

References

External links 

 

21st-century South African women singers
Afrikaans-language singers
Afrikaner people
Living people
1987 births